Cardiff is a hamlet in central Alberta, Canada within Sturgeon County.

History 
It was named after the prominent coal-mining centre of Cardiff, Wales, due to the large number of coal mines in the area.

Cardiff's coal mines were the scene of violence-ridden strikes in 1922.
Cardiff's shipping trade in 1912 was the largest on record for the community, with approximately 12,500,000 tons in trade. Imports exceeded 2,000,000 tons while exports were 10,400,000.

Demographics 

See also 
List of communities in Alberta
List of hamlets in Alberta

References 

Designated places in Alberta
Hamlets in Alberta
Sturgeon County